Events from the year 1721 in Great Britain.

Incumbents
 Monarch – George I
 Prime Minister – Robert Walpole (Whig) (starting 4 April)
 Parliament – 5th

Events
 6 January – The Committee of Inquiry on the collapse of the South Sea Company publishes its findings.
 5 February – Lord Stanhope, chief minister, dies a day after collapsing while vigorously defending his government's conduct over the "South Sea Bubble" in Parliament.
 9 March – John Aislabie imprisoned in the Tower of London, found guilty of corruption for his part in the collapse of the South Sea Company as Chancellor of the Exchequer.
 c. March – Atterbury Plot to restore the Stuart monarchy begins.
 4 April – Robert Walpole becomes the first Prime Minister (although this is more a term of disparagement at this time).

Undated
 Lady Mary Wortley Montagu introduces smallpox inoculation to Britain: the Princess of Wales is persuaded to test the treatment and the procedure becomes fashionable.
 Thomas Guy founds Guy's Hospital in London.
 Regular mail service between London and New England is established.

Publications
 Nathan Bailey publishes An Universal Etymological English Dictionary.
 Thomas Parnell's A Night-Piece on Death is published, inaugurating the "Graveyard poets" movement.

Births
 2 January – John Manners, Marquess of Granby (died 1770)
 19 March – Tobias Smollett, physician and author (died 1771)
 15 April – Prince William Augustus, Duke of Cumberland, military leader (died  1765)
 14 July – John Douglas, Anglican bishop and man of letters (died  1807)
 4 August – Granville Leveson-Gower, 1st Marquess of Stafford, politician (died  1803)
 31 August – George Hervey, 2nd Earl of Bristol, statesman (died  1775)
 9 November – Mark Akenside, poet and physician (died  1770)
 6 December – James Elphinston, philologist (died  1809)

Deaths
 5 February – James Stanhope, 1st Earl Stanhope, statesman and soldier (born c. 1673)
 16 February – James Craggs the Younger, politician (born 1686)
 24 February – John Sheffield, 1st Duke of Buckingham and Normanby, statesman and poet (born 1648)
 16 March – James Craggs the Elder, politician (born 1657)
 28 April – Mary Read, pirate, in Jamaica (born 1685)
 11 June – Sir Anthony Deane, naval architect and politician (born 1633)
 8 July – Elihu Yale, East India merchant and educationist (born 1649 in Massachusetts)
 3 August – Grinling Gibbons, sculptor (born 1648 in Rotterdam)
 18 September – Matthew Prior, poet and diplomat (born 1664)
 11 October – Edward Colston, merchant and philanthropist (born 1636)
 13 December – Alexander Selkirk, sailor (born 1676 in Scotland)
 17 December – Richard Lumley, 1st Earl of Scarbrough, statesman (born 1650)

References

 
Years in Great Britain